Elijah Parish (November 7, 1762– October 15, 1825) was a New England clergyman of the early nineteenth century.

Parish was a native of Lebanon, Connecticut.  He graduated from Dartmouth College in 1785.  In the early nineteenth century he was a leading opponent of the Jeffersonian Republican Party and brought issues of slavery into his political discourse.  Parish was elected a member of the American Antiquarian Society in 1813.

References

Sources
 Parish biography
 Mason, Matthew. Slavery and Politics in the Early American Republic. (2006) .

1762 births
1825 deaths
American clergy
Dartmouth College alumni
Members of the American Antiquarian Society